Silsiilay is a 2005 Indian Hindi-language romance film written and directed by Khalid Mohammed. The film stars Tabu, Bhumika Chawla, Riya Sen, Celina Jaitly, Anita Hassanandani, Divya Dutta, Rahul Bose, Jimmy Sheirgill, Ashmit Patel and Kay Kay Menon, while an extended appearance is played by Shah Rukh Khan. It was released on 17 June 2005.

Plot 

The film revolves around the story of three women.

Zia, who is a fast-rising Bollywood actress, whose live-in relationship is about to break up with the man who has groomed her for a film career, Neel. She wants a child with him but he does not want any responsibilities. Soon he moves on and finds another girlfriend.

Anushka is a telephone receptionist who longs to discover tenderness in her relationship with a wealthy suitor Nikhil. Meanwhile, her office colleague, Tarun, loves her silently. The working girl must decide between the two in a romantic finale that has a twist in the tale. Natassha features in a role that has a big impact. The three stories are weaved into a composite picture, with the women coming together in an act of solidarity.

Rehana is a housewife who must confront the fact that her husband Anwar  is being unfaithful to her with an air hostess, Preeti.

Cast 

Story 1
Bhumika Chawla as Zia Rao Katyal 
Rahul Bose as Neel Kashyap
Divya Dutta as Diya Rao Katyal
Priya Badlani as Nandita 
Aamir Ali as a Bollywood actor
Tabu as Rehana Ahmed Bhoy, Ziya's fan

Story 2
Riya Sen as Anushka Verma
Jimmy Sheirgill as Tarun Ahuja
Ashmit Patel as Nikhil Rai
Anita Hassanandani as Piya Mahajan

Story 3
Tabu as Rehana Ahmed Bhoy 
Kay Kay Menon as Anwar Ahmed Bhoy
Celina Jaitly as Preeti
 Karan Panthaky as Inayat Ahmed Bhoy (Anwar's son from his first wife)
Priya Badlani as Nandita (Preeti's friend)

Other casts
Shah Rukh Khan as the Sutradhaar (Narrator)
Dolly Bindra as Ziya's fan / Woman at the beach / Sheetal
Rakesh Bedi as Harry (Nandita's uncle) / Anushka's boss

Soundtrack

Music by Himesh Reshammiya and lyrics by Sameer.

Critical reception
Taran Adarsh of Bollywood Hungama gave the film 1.5 stars out of 5, saying "Silsilay is more of an experiment that caters to a very small segment of moviegoers. At the box-office, the film holds no appeal for an ordinary cinegoer." Sukanya Verma of Rediff.com wrote "Among the three stories, the first is clever, the second is predictable and the third is emotional. The climax is dealt in a disappointing manner. The film could have ended earlier, instead it stretches unnecessarily for seven or eight minutes."

References

External links
 
 

2005 films
2000s Hindi-language films
Films scored by Himesh Reshammiya
Hyperlink films